Colleen Flynn is an American actress. In 1995, Flynn earned a nomination for Primetime Emmy Award for Outstanding Guest Actress in a Drama Series for her performance in an episode "Love's Labor Lost" of NBC medical drama ER.

Flynn was regular cast member on the short-lived series such as Flipper and To Have & to Hold. She also appeared in a recurring roles on China Beach, The Practice, Judging Amy and Nip/Tuck. Flynn guest-starred on television series such as The X-Files, Roswell, Crossing Jordan, Without a Trace, The Drew Carey Show, Everwood, The Closer, Cold Case, House and Grey's Anatomy.

Her film credits include Last Exit to Brooklyn, Serving in Silence: The Margarethe Cammermeyer Story, Two Mothers for Zachary, Clear and Present Danger, Pay It Forward and Project X.

Selected filmography

Film
Last Exit to Brooklyn (1989) as Ruthie
Late for Dinner (1991) as Adult Jessica Husband
The Temp (1993) as Sara Meinhold
Clear and Present Danger (1994) as Coast Guard Captain
Pay It Forward (2000) as Woman on Bridge
Project X (2012) as Mrs. Stillson

Television 
China Beach as Dr. Colleen Flaherty Richards (3 episodes, 1990–91)
Equal Justice as Kerry Lynn (3 episodes, 1991)
ER as Jodi O'Brien (episode "Love's Labor Lost", 1995)
Flipper as Dr. Pamela Blondell (series regular, 22 episodes, 1995–96)
Two Mothers for Zachary as Maggie Fergus (1996)
Orleans as Paulette Charbonnet (series regular, 8 episodes, 1997)
The Devil's Child as Ruby Martin (1997)
To Have & to Hold as Carolyn McGrail (series regular, 13 episodes, 1998)
The X Files Colleen Azar / Michele Fazekas (2 episodes, 1997, 2000)
Without a trace as Katherine Kent in episode 'Silent Partner' (Oct, 2002) 
The Practice as Wendy Stuart (3 episodes, 2004)
Judging Amy as Lolly Wetzel (7 episodes, 2000–04)
Nip/Tuck as Dr. Allamby (4 episodes, 2005–06)
House as Enid (patient's mother) in episode 'The Jerk' (2007)
Sweet Nothing in My Ear as Priscilla Scott (2008)
Better Call Saul (1 episode, 2018)

References

External links
 

Actresses from New Jersey
American film actresses
American television actresses
Living people
21st-century American women
Year of birth missing (living people)